Oxxford Clothes is a luxury men's suit and sport coat manufacturer based in Chicago, Illinois. Individualized Apparel Group currently owns the brand. Forbes magazine has rated Oxxford as the best American-made suit. Oxxford Clothes was called "the quintessential American suit maker" by Robb Report.

History

Oxxford Clothes was founded in 1916 by Jacob and Louis Weinberg. The misspelling of "Oxford" was intentional. 
In 2016 Oxxford sold its historic building  in Chicago's West Loop on Van Buren Street, and moved  to the Southwest Side on Archer Avenue near Midway Airport. Following the move, Oxxford partnered with Richard Bennett Custom Tailors in the Loop for client fittings. 
Oxxford Clothes currently produces nearly 8,000 suits per year, far less than the 35,000 suits Oxxford produced annually in the 1980s.

See also
Hardwick Clothes
Paul Stuart
J. Press
Hartmarx
Henry Poole & Co 
Ozwald Boateng 
Timothy Everest
Hardy Amies Ltd
Gieves & Hawkes 
Richard James
Joseph Abboud

References

External links
Oxxford Clothes

Clothing brands of the United States
Companies based in Chicago
High fashion brands
1916 establishments in Illinois
Clothing companies established in 1916
American companies established in 1916
Suit makers
Luxury brands